The NWA World Light Heavyweight Championship was a professional wrestling championship sanctioned by the National Wrestling Alliance (NWA). For the majority of its existence the title was promoted by Mexican promotion Consejo Mundial de Lucha Libre (CMLL), where it was known in Spanish as the Campeonato Mundial Semi Completo de NWA. It began as an official National Wrestling Alliance (NWA) title and was given to the NWA's Mexican affiliate, Empresa Mexicana de Lucha Libre (EMLL, later CMLL), to control. The title was also promoted in NWA Hollywood Wrestling until Hollywood Wrestling's closure in 1982. The title remained under the control of EMLL even after EMLL pulled out of the NWA and changed its name to Consejo Mundial de Lucha Libre. Due to its history, it was considered the one of the most important titles in EMLL/CMLL. As it was a professional wrestling championship, it was not won legitimately; it was instead won via a scripted ending to a match or awarded to a wrestler because of a storyline.

The first champion was Gypsy Joe, who won the title on November 6, 1952. In 1957 the NWA stripped Frank Stojack of the title for lack of NWA-mandated title defenses, but Stojack kept the physical belt and defended the title for over a year until the NWA regained possession of the actual Championship belt. After Stojack was stripped of the title, the NWA executive board decided to give Salvador Lutteroth and Empresa Mexicana de Lucha Libre control of the championship in 1958. The first champion under Lutteroth's authority was Dory Dixon, who had worked for EMLL for many years. During the late 1970s and early 1980s the title was also defended in the Los Angeles area; after the 1980s, the title was only defended in Mexico.

In March 2010, Blue Demon, Jr., the president of NWA Mexico, sent letters to CMLL, telling them to stop promoting the NWA-branded championships since they were not part of the NWA. NWA Mexico had previously tried to reclaim the three NWA-branded championships promoted by CMLL, but was ignored by CMLL. The promotion did not directly respond to the latest claim either; the NWA Welterweight Champion, Mephisto, commented, simply stating that the titles belonged to CMLL. Finally, on August 12, 2010, CMLL debuted the new NWA World Historic Light Heavyweight Championship and returned the old title to NWA. In 2013, NWA Mexico crowned its first recognized World Light Heavyweight Champion, with Súper Nova winning the vacant title. Súper Nova has not defended the title since 2014, with the championship being de facto retired.

There have been a total of 65 reigns shared between 40 wrestlers. Ray Mendoza has held the Championship the highest number of times with six title reigns; Gory Guerrero's two reigns combined come to 1,963 days, the highest total of any champion. Roddy Piper is the champion with the shortest reign, 2 days; while the longest title reign belongs to Frank Stojack with 1,573 days.

Title history

Reigns by combined length
Key

Footnotes

The NWA endorsed another NWA World Light Heavyweight Championship in New Jersey in 1997 and 1998, referred to as the "New Jersey version"; this short-lived title was not connected to the CMLL version.

See also
List of National Wrestling Alliance championships

References

General source for title changes before 2000
[G] - 
Specific

External links

  (Archived)
 NWA Title Histories

Consejo Mundial de Lucha Libre championships
Light heavyweight wrestling championships
National Wrestling Alliance championships
World professional wrestling championships